Tackhead Sound Crash is a remix album by the industrial hip-hop group Tackhead. It was released on November 13, 2006 on Beat and On-U Sound Records.

Track listing

Personnel 

Tackhead
Keith LeBlanc – drums
Skip McDonald – guitar
Adrian Sherwood – effects
Doug Wimbish – bass guitar

Technical personnel
Nick Coplowe – engineering (4, 6, 18-20)
Tackhead – producer

Release history

References

External links 
 

2006 remix albums
Tackhead albums
On-U Sound Records albums